Scotchenflipper Creek (sometimes spelled "Scotchen Flippa Creek") is a stream in the U.S. state of Mississippi. It is a tributary to Souenlovie Creek.

A variant name is "Chenokaby Creek". Chenokaby is a name derived from the Choctaw language meaning "crooked".

References

Rivers of Mississippi
Rivers of Jasper County, Mississippi
Rivers of Newton County, Mississippi
Mississippi placenames of Native American origin